The North American porcupine (Erethizon dorsatum), also known as the Canadian porcupine, is a large quill-covered rodent in the New World porcupine family. It is the second largest rodent in North America, after the North American beaver (Castor canadensis). The porcupine is a caviomorph rodent whose ancestors crossed the Atlantic from Africa to Brazil 30 million years ago, and then migrated to North America during the Great American Interchange after the Isthmus of Panama rose 3 million years ago.

Etymology
The word "porcupine" comes from the middle or old French word , which means 'thorn pig'. Its roots derive from the Latin words  or pig and  meaning thorns. Other colloquial names for the animal include quill pig. It is also referred to as the Canadian porcupine or common porcupine. The porcupine's scientific name, Erethizon dorsatum, can be loosely translated as "the animal with the irritating back". Native American terms for it include the Lakota name  meaning quill, the Ho-Chunk name , and the Chipewyan name .

Taxonomy and evolution
The North American porcupine migrated from South America, where all New World porcupines or hystricomorphs evolved. Erethizon appeared in North America shortly after the two continents joined together in the later Tertiary period. Other hystricomorphs also migrated, but Erethizon was the only one to survive north of Mexico. No known fossils are attributed to hystricomorphs prior to the late Tertiary period. Some fossils, such as species from the family Paramyidae, show resemblance to the porcupine, but they are so primitive and generalized that they could be ancestors to all later rodents.

South American hystricomorphs first appeared in the Lower Oligocene period. They are thought to have migrated from Africa, ancestors of the Old World porcupines or Hystricidae or they originated based on a migration of the North American Paramyidae.

The earliest appearance of E. dorsatum is from the Pleistocene era found along the Arroyo del Cedazo near Aguascalientes, Mexico.

Subspecies
Seven subspecies of E. dorsatum are recognized. They are subdivided by different ranges across North America. By far the most common is E. d. dorsatum, which ranges from Nova Scotia to Alberta and from Virginia to the Yukon. E. d. picinum occupies a small range in northeastern Quebec and Labrador. E. d. couesi is the most southern ranging from northern Mexico to Colorado. E. d. bruneri can be found in the midwest from Arkansas to Montana. The last three are found in the west. From south to north they are E.d. epixanthum, E. d. nigrescens, and E. d. myops.

Description

Porcupines are usually dark brown or black in color, with white highlights. They have a stocky body, a small face, short legs, and a short, thick tail. This species is the largest of the New World porcupines and is the second largest North American rodent, after the American beaver. Weight in adult females can average some  while 5 wild-caught males averaged .

The porcupine possesses antibiotics in its skin which may help prevent infection when a porcupine falls out of a tree and is stuck with its own quills upon hitting the ground. Porcupines fall out of trees fairly often because they are highly tempted by the succulent buds and tender twigs at the ends of the branches. The porcupine, the wolverine, and the skunk are the only North American mammals that have strongly contrasting black-and-white coloration, because they are the only mammals that benefit from letting other animals know where and what they are in the dark of night.

Quills

The most distinguishing feature of the porcupine is its coat of quills. An adult porcupine has about 30,000 quills that cover all of its body except its underbelly, face, and feet. Quills are modified hairs formed into sharp, barbed, hollow spines. They are used primarily for defense, but also serve to insulate their bodies during winter. The quills are normally flattened against the body and in this position are less easily dislodged. Porcupines do not throw their quills, but when threatened contract superficial muscles which cause the quills to stand up and out from their bodies. In this position they become easier to detach from the body, especially when the tail is swung toward an attacker. The barbs at the end of the spines lodge in the flesh of a victim and are difficult and painful to remove.

Stench
The North American porcupine has a strong odor to warn away predators, which it can increase when agitated. The smell has been described as similar to strong human body odor, goats, or some cheeses. The odor is generated by a patch of skin called the rosette, on the lower back where modified quills serve as osmetrichia to broadcast the smell. The characteristic odor comes from the R-enantiomer of delta-decalactone. Not present is the S-enantiomer which smells like coconut and is used in flavorings and perfumes.

Distribution and habitat
In eastern North America, porcupines range from Canada to the Appalachian Mountains in West Virginia and Maryland. In the west they range from Alaska to northern mountains in Mexico. They are commonly found in coniferous and mixed forested areas, but have adapted to harsh environments such as shrublands and tundra. They make their dens in hollow trees or in rocky areas.

Ecology

Diet

During the summer, they eat twigs, roots, stems, berries, leaves, and other vegetation. Porcupines also eat certain insects and nuts. In the winter, they mainly eat conifer needles and tree bark. Porcupines are selective in their consumption; for example out of every 1,000 trees in the Catskill Mountains, porcupines will only eat from 1-2 linden trees and one big toothed aspen.

Behavior

Porcupines are nearsighted and slow-moving. They are mainly active at night (nocturnal); on summer days, they often rest in trees. They do not hibernate, but sleep in and stay close to their dens in winter. The strength of the porcupine's defense has given it the ability to live a solitary life, unlike many herbivores, which must move in flocks or herds. Consequently, the porcupine has "an extraordinary ability to learn complex mazes and to remember them as much as a hundred days afterward".

Defense

The North American porcupine has specific behaviors to warn or defend against predators. The defense strategy is based on aposematism in several modalities. It has a strong warning odor which it can increase when agitated. When threatened, an adult porcupine can bristle its quills, displaying a white stripe down its back, and use its teeth to make a warning, clacking sound. If the olfactory, visual, and auditory warnings fail, then it can rely on its quills. An adult porcupine when attacked turns its rear to the predator. When approached, the porcupine can swing its tail at an attacker's face. Despite popular myth, the porcupine does not throw its quills. Instead, when a quill comes in contact with the attacker, it can easily penetrate and become embedded in its skin. Each quill contains microscopic barbs which allow it to stick into the flesh of an attacker. This strategy is successful against most attacks. With a face full of quills, an attacking creature often retreats. The porcupine's last line of defense is to climb a tree.

Predators
Natural predators of this species include fishers (a cat-sized mustelid), wolverines, coyotes, wolves, American black bears, and cougars, as well as humans. The only known avian predators of this species are golden eagles and great horned owls. In many cases, injury or even death may occur in the predator from embedded porcupine quills even if they are successful in dispatching the porcupine.

Fishers have two advantages that make them capable hunters of the porcupine. First, they are agile tree climbers, and may force a fleeing porcupine from a tree to the ground, where it is more vulnerable. There it will try to present its hindquarters and tail to the attacker, with the predator circling around and attempting to attack the prey. After repeated attacks, the porcupine eventually weakens, allowing the fisher to flip the porcupine over, rip open its underbelly, and consume its organs without exposing itself to the still dangerous quills. One study suggested that since male fishers are considerably larger than females (often weighing on average twice as much), only males are likely to hunt porcupines. It appears that female fishers usually favor prey such as snowshoe hares.

Another effective predator is the cougar. It does not avoid the quills so much as seek to avoid being impaled by too many of them. Some individuals have been found with dozens of quills embedded in their gums to no ill effect. It can climb trees, so its favorite method is to position itself below the porcupine and knock it to the ground, quickly dispatching it. Other predators, such as canids (wolves and coyotes), may attack but do not pose much of a threat. In some parts of the Great Basin, cougars have greatly decreased numbers of porcupines in mountainous forests through predation. However, in some cases porcupine quills have indeed killed cougars, although usually this is after the cougar has already consumed the porcupine.

Reproduction

Female porcupines are solitary for most of the year except during the fall when breeding season begins. At this time, they secrete a thick mucus which mixes with their urine. The resulting odor attracts males in the vicinity. Males that approach a female do not automatically begin mating. The first male that comes along typically sits in the same tree below a female. If another male approaches, he may fight for the right to mate. Once a dominant male is successful, he approaches the female and uses a spray of his urine on the female. Only a few drops touch the female, but the chemical reaction allows the female to fully enter estrus. Once this is accomplished high in the tree, the mating process takes place on the ground. When porcupines are mating, they tighten their skin and hold their quills flat, so as not to injure each other. Mating may occur repeatedly until the female loses interest and climbs back into the tree.

The North American porcupine has a long gestation period relative to other rodents, an average of 202 days. By contrast, the North American beaver, which is comparable in size, has a gestation period of 128 days. The eastern grey squirrel (Sciurus carolinensis) has a gestation period of just 44 days. Porcupines give birth to a single young.  At birth, they weigh about 450 g, which increases to nearly 1 kg after the first two weeks. They do not gain full adult weight until the end of the second summer about 4.5 kg. Their quills harden soon after birth.

Female porcupines provide all parental care. For the first two weeks the young rely on their mother for sustenance. After this they learn to climb trees and start to forage. They continue to nurse for up to four months, which coincides with the fall mating season. They stay close to their mothers. Mother porcupines do not defend their young, but have been known to care for them even after death. In one case, when a baby had fallen to its death from a tree, the mother came down and stayed by her offspring's side for hours waiting vainly for it to revive.

Life expectancy
North American porcupines have a relatively long life expectancy, with some individuals reaching 30 years of age. Common causes of mortality include predation, starvation, falling out of a tree, and being run over by motor vehicles.

Porcupines and humans
Porcupines are considered by some to be pests because of the damage that they often inflict on trees and wooden and leather objects. Plywood is especially vulnerable because of the salts added during manufacture. They also often injure domestic dogs who inspect or attack them. 

Their quills are used by Native Americans to decorate articles such as baskets and clothing. Porcupines are edible and were an important source of food, especially in winter, to the native peoples of Canada's boreal forests. They move slowly (having few threats in their natural environment) and are often hit by vehicles while crossing roads.

Porcupines are infamous among backpackers and backpacking publications for their love of salt, especially eating road salt-covered boots left outside of tents overnight. They have a similar reputation among forestry workers of all types for trying to eat sweat-soaked gloves and wooden handles on tools.

Conservation status
Globally, the North American porcupine is listed as a species of least concern. It is common throughout its range except in some U.S. states in the southeast part of its range. For example, it is listed as a species in need of conservation in Maryland. As of 1999, 15 remnant populations remain scattered throughout north-central Mexico. These live in riparian forests, mesquite scrubland, grasslands, and thorn forests. They are threatened by hunting and habitat loss. As of 1994, the animal was listed as an endangered species in Mexico.

References

Notes

Citations

Further reading

External links

Porcupine videos, photos, and facts Arkive.org

North American porcupine
Erethizontidae
Fauna of the Eastern United States
Fauna of the Great Lakes region (North America)
Fauna of the Rocky Mountains
Fauna of the Western United States
Mammals of Canada
Mammals of Mexico
Mammals of the United States
Extant Pleistocene first appearances
Rodents of North America
North American porcupine